Tim Johannes Barend Aloysius van Assema (born 31 January 2002) is a Dutch footballer who plays for Tvååkers IF as a midfielder.

References

External links 
 

2002 births
Living people
Dutch footballers
Allsvenskan players
Ettan Fotboll players
IFK Göteborg players
Tvååkers IF players
Association football midfielders